Hamburger Börs may refer to:

Hamburger Börs, Stockholm, a venue in Sweden
Hamburger Börs, Turku, a hotel in Finland

See also
Hamburger Börse, the Hamburg Stock Exchange